Henry Marsden (born 1902, date of death unknown) was an English footballer active in the 1920s and 1930s.  He made a total of 209 appearances in The Football League for Nottingham Forest, Brighton & Hove Albion and Gillingham.

References

1902 births
English Football League players
Nottingham Forest F.C. players
Brighton & Hove Albion F.C. players
Gillingham F.C. players
English footballers
Date of death missing
Association footballers not categorized by position